Thylactus filipinus is a species of beetle in the family Cerambycidae. It was described by Vives in 2013. It is known from the Philippines.

References

Xylorhizini
Beetles described in 2013